Alway is an electoral district (ward) and coterminous community (formerly civil parish) of the city of Newport.

The ward is bounded by the Great Western Main Line to the south, Windsor Road, Chepstow Road and Beechwood Road to the west, the M4 motorway to the north, and a line running between Glanwern Grove, Ringwood Hill, Ringland Circle, Aberthaw Road, and Balfe Road to the east. The area is governed by the Newport City Council.

The ward contains the Alway estate itself plus Somerton and the eastern fringes of Beechwood around Beechwood Park. It is also home to Ladyhill Reservoir, a 22.5 ML treated water storage facility that serves the east of the city.

All the roads in the Alway Estate are named after famous composers.

See also
Somerton TARDIS

References

External links 

Communities in Newport, Wales
Wards of Newport, Wales